Mario Gentili (born 5 March 1962) is a retired Italian amateur cyclist. He won the world title in motor-paced racing in 1986 and 1987, after placing third in 1985. In 1987 he also won one stage of Cinturón a Mallorca, and finished third overall.

References 

1962 births
Living people
Italian male cyclists
Cyclists from Rome